The WWC North American Heavyweight Championship was a professional wrestling championship defended in the Puerto Rican promotion, the World Wrestling Council. Created in 1974, it was the primary singles championship of the promotion until the creation of the WWC Universal Heavyweight Championship in 1982. It was then relegated to secondary status until it was abandoned sometime in late 1991.

Title history

Combined Reigns

See also
World Wrestling Council

References

External links
Wrestling-Titles.com

Heavyweight wrestling championships
World Wrestling Council championships
North American professional wrestling championships